The Africa Zone served as a qualifying round to the 1986 Davis Cup Europe Zone.

Teams from 9 African nations competed for 2 places in the Europe Zone main draws. Zimbabwe and Nigeria were the winners of the Africa Zone and qualified for the Europe Zone main draws.

Participating nations

Draw

First round

Tunisia vs. Nigeria

Second round

Zimbabwe vs. Libya

Morocco vs. Kenya

Senegal vs. Nigeria

Algeria vs. Ivory Coast

Third round

Zimbabwe vs. Morocco

Algeria vs. Nigeria

References

External links
Davis Cup official website

Davis Cup Europe/Africa Zone
Africa Zone